BECON is the former name of the American television station WBEC-TV.

Becon is an English surname; notable people with this name include:
 John Becon (died 1587), English divine
 Richard Becon, English administrator in Ireland and author
 Thomas Becon (1510s–1567), English cleric and reformer

BEcon, an abbreviation for the Bachelor of Economics

See also 
 Becon Ganj, an area in Kanpur, India
 Pont de Levallois – Bécon (Paris Métro), a station on the Paris metro
 Beacon (disambiguation)
 Bacon (disambiguation)